The Poem of the End ('poema kontsa') is the name of two poems by Russian poets of the early 20th century.

Poem of the End (usually given in English without an article) is the best known poem by Russian poet Vasilisk Gnedov. One of the most radically experimental poets of Russian Futurism, Gnedov's Poem of the End consisted of its title alone on a blank page.  Gnedov would perform the poem on stage using a silent gesture. The collection from which it came, Death to Art (1913), contained fifteen very short poems that gradually reduced in size from one line, to one word, one letter, and ultimately to Poem of the End. The poem has been compared to Kazimir Malevich's painting Black Square (1915), John Cage's silent composition 4'33" (1952), and to Minimalism in general.  A "recreation" of the performance of the poem was realized in 2007 by Miguel Molina, and released on cd by Recommended Records (ReR Megacorp) in a limited edition of 150 in 2009.  The recording for the cd consists of approximately one hour of "silence" as captured via a wax cylinder, a recording device appropriate to the time.

The Poem of the End (with "The" in the title) is a major poem by the White Russian symbolist poet Marina Tsvetaeva. 
Written in Prague in 1924, the poem details the end of a passionate affair with Konstantin Boeslavovich Rozdevitch, a former military officer. Each of the sections deals with the crossing of a bridge and the symbolism is echoed relentlessly throughout the poem; the mood is unremittingly tense and foreboding.

Lovers for the most
part are without hope: passion
also is just
a bridge, a means of connection

(from the Elaine Feinstein translation).

The happy lot
Of lovers without hope:
Bridge, you are like passion:
A convention: pure transition.
 
(from the Nina Kossman translation)

Russian poems
1924 poems
1914 poems